Lapsanastrum is a genus of flowering plants in the family Asteraceae, native to East Asia (China, Korea, Japan).

 Species
 Lapsanastrum apogonoides (Maxim.) Pak & K.Bremer - Anhui, Fujian, Guangdong, Guangxi, Hunan, Jiangsu, Jiangxi, Shaanxi, Taiwan, Yunnan, Zhejiang, Japan, Korea; naturalized in Oregon
 Lapsanastrum humile (Thunb.) Pak & K.Bremer - Anhui, Fujian, Jiangsu, Zhejiang, Japan, Korea
 Lapsanastrum takasei (Sasaki) Pak & K.Bremer - Taiwan
 Lapsanastrum uncinatum (Stebbins) Pak & K.Bremer - Anhui

References

Asteraceae genera
Cichorieae